Virgil is a hamlet and census-designated place (CDP) in the town of Virgil, Cortland County, New York, United States. The population was 298 at the 2020 census.

Geography
The hamlet of Virgil is located in the west-central part of the town of Virgil, in the valley of Virgil Creek, a west-flowing stream which is part of the Cayuga Lake watershed. New York State Routes 392 and 215 intersect at the center of the hamlet. Route 392 leads east  to U.S. Route 11 in Messengerville, and west  to NY Route 13 in the village of Dryden, while Route 215 leads north  to Cortland, the county seat.

Demographics

References

Census-designated places in New York (state)
Census-designated places in Cortland County, New York